Małgorzata Dydek, also known as Margo Dydek (28 April 1974 – 27 May 2011), was a Polish professional basketball player. She played center position for multiple teams in the WNBA and was a coach for the Northside Wizards in the Queensland Basketball League. She was awarded the Polish Gold Cross of Merit (1999).

She was inducted into the FIBA Hall of Fame in 2019.

Early life
Margo Dydek was born 28 April 1974 in Warsaw, Poland, to a  father and a  mother. She had two sisters, her elder sister, Katarzyna() used to play for the Colorado Xplosion of the now defunct ABL. Her younger sister (12 years younger), Marta, graduated from the University of Texas–El Paso where she played basketball, and played in Spain professionally in the 2000s.

WNBA career
Dydek made her first trip to the United States in May 1998 for WNBA pre-draft camp. Dydek was drafted 1st overall in the 1998 WNBA draft by the Utah Starzz (the franchise was subsequently transferred to San Antonio).

On 16 April 2005, during the 2005 WNBA draft, the San Antonio Silver Stars traded Dydek to the Connecticut Sun in exchange for the Sun's first-round draft pick, Katie Feenstra from Liberty University.

Records held:
All-time leader in blocks (877), in 323 games
Leader in season total blocks nine times (1998–2003, 2005–07)
Leader in season blocks per game eight times (1998–2003, 2006, 2007)
Most defensive rebounds (214) in 2001

On 3 June 2008, Dydek signed with the Los Angeles Sparks, following time away from basketball due to her pregnancy. She gave birth to her son, David, in April that year.

European career
Dydek played for Olimpia Poznań from 1992 to 1994, before playing for Valenciennes Orchies in France from 1994 to 1996, where she met her future husband, David. She then moved to Spain and played for Pool Getafe from 1996 to 1998, and moved back to Poland to play for Fota Porta Gdynia starting with the 1998–99 season. She continued to play with the club through several sponsorship changes; since then, the club has taken the names Polpharma and Lotos.

In 1999–2000 she averaged 18.5 points and 10.7 rebounds for Gdynia in FIBA EuroLeague play. She was named Most Valuable Player of the Polish League Finals of the 1999–2000 season. In 1999, she was also named the best female basketball player in Europe by the Italian sports magazine La Gazzetta dello Sport. Dydek was chosen as Poland's Sports Woman of the Year and was a member of the Poland women's national basketball team until 2007, winning the EuroBasket Women 1999. She helped lead Gdynia to runner-up finishes in the FIBA EuroLeague in 2002 and 2004.

Career statistics

WNBA

Source

Regular season

|-
| style="text-align:left;"| 1998
| style="text-align:left;"| Utah
| style="background:#D3D3D3"|30° || style="background:#D3D3D3"|30° || 28.0 || .482 || .143 || .732 || 7.8 || 1.8 || 0.5 || style="background:#D3D3D3"|3.8° || 3.6 || 12.9
|-
| style="text-align:left;"| 1999
| style="text-align:left;"| Utah
| style="background:#D3D3D3"|32° || 28 || 22.9 || .498 || .350 || .857 || 6.4 || 1.8 || 0.4 || style="background:#D3D3D3"|2.4° || 2.8 || 12.6
|-
| style="text-align:left;"| 2000
| style="text-align:left;"| Utah
| style="background:#D3D3D3"|32°  || style="background:#D3D3D3"|32°  || 24.2 || .445 || .143 || .796 || 5.5 || 1.6 || 0.6 || style="background:#D3D3D3"|3.0° || 2.6 || 9.2
|-
| style="text-align:left;"| 2001
| style="text-align:left;"| Utah
| style="background:#D3D3D3"|32° || style="background:#D3D3D3"|32° || 30.3 || .440 || .400 || .798 || 7.6 || 2.0 || 0.8 || style="background:#D3D3D3"|3.5° || 2.8 || 10.9
|-
| style="text-align:left;"| 2002
| style="text-align:left;"| Utah
| 30 || 27 || 29.2 || .436 || .250 || .844 || 8.7 || 2.4 || 0.8 || style="background:#D3D3D3"|3.6° || 3.2 || 13.1
|-
| style="text-align:left;"| 2003
| style="text-align:left;"| San Antonio
| style="background:#D3D3D3"|34° || style="background:#D3D3D3"|34° || 27.2 || .451 || .000 || .723 || 7.4 || 1.7 || 0.6 || style="background:#D3D3D3"|2.9° || 2.4 || 11.9
|-
| style="text-align:left;"| 2004
| style="text-align:left;"| San Antonio
| style="background:#D3D3D3"|34° || 24 || 20.1 || .433 || .500 || .759 || 4.9 || 1.8 || 0.6 || 1.4 || 1.9 || 6.6
|-
| style="text-align:left;"| 2005
| style="text-align:left;"| Connecticut
| 31 || 30 || 21.6 || .537 || .500 || .769 || 6.3 || 1.2 || 0.3 || 2.3 || 1.5 || 7.3
|-
| style="text-align:left;"| 2006
| style="text-align:left;"| Connecticut
| style="background:#D3D3D3"|34° || style="background:#D3D3D3"|34° || 21.9 || .494 || .250 || .821 || 6.1 || 1.2 || 0.6 || style="background:#D3D3D3"|2.5° || 1.5 || 9.4
|-
| style="text-align:left;"| 2007
| style="text-align:left;"| Connecticut
| 32 || 30 || 20.1 || .487 || .400 || .789 || 6.5 || 1.0 || 0.4 || style="background:#D3D3D3"|2.1° || 1.6 || 6.7
|-
| style="text-align:left;"| 2008
| style="text-align:left;"| Los Angeles
| 2 || 0 || 7.0 || .400 || – || – || 1.5 || 0.0 || 0.0 || 0.0 || 0.0 || 2.0
|- class="sortbottom"
| style="text-align:left;"| Career
| style="text-align:left;"| 11 years, 3 teams
| 323 || 301 || 24.4 || .467 || .295 || .791 || 6.6 || 1.6 || 0.5 || 2.7 || 2.3 || 10.0
|}

Playoffs

|-
| style="text-align:left;"| 2001
| style="text-align:left;"| Utah
| 2 || 2 || 34.5 || .429 || – || .769 || 7.0 || 1.5 || 0.5 || 3.5 || 2.0 || 14.0
|-
| style="text-align:left;"| 2002
| style="text-align:left;"| Utah
| 5 || 5 || 34.2 || .400 || .600 || .867 || 8.8 || 2.4 || 0.2 || 3.4 || 3.2 || 12.0
|-
| style="text-align:left;"| 2005
| style="text-align:left;"| Connecticut
| 8 || 8 || 18.3 || .376 || 1.000 || .636 || 5.3 || 0.5 || 0.4 || 1.6 || 2.0 || 4.5
|-
| style="text-align:left;"| 2006
| style="text-align:left;"| Connecticut
| 5 || 5 || 26.6 || .458 || .000 || .846 || 7.2 || 0.8 || 0.8 || 2.8 || 1.6 || 11.0
|-
| style="text-align:left;"| 2007
| style="text-align:left;"| Connecticut
| 3 || 3 || 26.7 || .400 || .500 || .000 || 6.3 || 0.7 || 0.0 || 2.7 || 1.0 || 7.0
|-
| style="text-align:left;"| 2008
| style="text-align:left;"| Los Angeles
| 1 || 0 || 1.0 || – || – || – || 1.0 || 0.0 || 0.0 || 0.0 || 0.0 || 0.0
|- class="sortbottom"
| style="text-align:left;"| Career
| style="text-align:left;"| 6 years, 3 teams
| 24 || 23 || 25.0 || .412 || .556 || .759 || 6.5 || 1.0 || 0.4 || 2.5 || 2.0 || 8.3
|}

Personal life
Dydek was married and had two sons.

Death
On 19 May 2011, Dydek, at the time pregnant with her third child, collapsed at her home in Brisbane due to cardiac arrest. She was taken by ambulance to a hospital and placed in a medically induced coma. She had been working as a coach for the Northside Wizards in the Queensland Basketball League. She never regained consciousness and died eight days later on 27 May 2011.

References

External links 

 
 Interbasket.net: Margo Dydek

1974 births
2011 deaths
Basketball players at the 2000 Summer Olympics
Basketball players from Warsaw
Centers (basketball)
Connecticut Sun players
FIBA Hall of Fame inductees
Los Angeles Sparks players
Olympic basketball players of Poland
Polish expatriate basketball people in the United States
Polish expatriate basketball people in France
Polish expatriate basketball people in Spain
Polish women's basketball players
Recipients of the Cross of Merit (Poland)
Recipients of the Order of Polonia Restituta
San Antonio Stars players
Sportspeople from Poznań
Utah Starzz draft picks
Utah Starzz players
Women's National Basketball Association All-Stars
Women's National Basketball Association first-overall draft picks